Save My Soul may refer to:

Save My Soul (album) or the title song, by Big Bad Voodoo Daddy, 2003
Save My Soul, an album by Padi, 2003
"Save My Soul" (Decadance song), 1994
"Save My Soul" (Kristine W song), 2004
"Save My Soul", a song by Groove Armada from Soundboy Rock, 2007
"Save My Soul", a song by JoJo from III, 2015

See also
"Saved My Soul", a song by Audio Adrenaline from Sound of the Saints, 2015
"Who's Gonna Save My Soul", a song by Gnarls Barkley, 2008